Karl Sarkis (born 26 July 1986) is a Lebanese basketball player with Champville SC  of the Lebanese Basketball League. He played in the 2009-10 season with Lebanese division 2 side Blue Stars before being promoted to division one with Hekmeh BC. in the 2012-13 season Karl then moved to Champville SC to play for 1 seasons, until the 2012-14 season in which he moved to Amchit Club.

References

 

1986 births
Living people
Lebanese men's basketball players
Point guards
Sagesse SC basketball players